Sydney United 58 FC is an association football club based in Sydney, Australia. The club was formed in 1958.

History

Seasons

Notes

References

External links
 Ozfootball Sydney United

Sydney United 58 FC